Hong Kong–Macau relations refers to bilateral relations between Hong Kong and Macau.

History
Hong Kong and Macau bilateral relations could be traced back to the Middle Neolithic. Both Hong Kong and Macau were under the influence of the same type of Neolithic culture. Tools and ornaments used by both places show tight relationship in idea and trade between the two. Hong Kong became the first European colony in East Asia for being occupied by the Portuguese Empire as Tamão in the early 16th Century. The Portuguese were defeated by the Ming Empire in Hong Kong in 1521, and eventually took Macau as their settlement at the Pearl River Estuary as a replacement. Macau had stood long as the most important European entrepot in East Asia since the 17th Century. Only when Hong Kong fell into the British hands in the early 1840s, did Macau begin to face regional competition from a more open and free British Hong Kong. Since then, Hong Kong and Macau have competed and cooperated as commercial centres in the Pearl River Estuary. Eventually Hong Kong developed as one of the busiest entrepots and financial centres while Macau became a world gambling capital. In 2018, a fixed-link connecting Hong Kong and Macau opened—the Hong Kong–Zhuhai–Macau Bridge.

Trade
As at 2015, Macau is Hong Kong's second largest export destination, occupying 6.1% of Hong Kong's total exports. The amount of export totaled USD 8.4B, with broadcasting equipment, jewellery, and precious metal watches as the major products. On the other hand, Hong Kong is Macau's largest export destination. Totaled USD 774M, with precious metal watches, jewelry, trunks and cases as the major trading products, the exports to the Hong Kong forms 53% of Macau's total exports.

Since 2018, Hong Kong and Macau have been connected via road by the Hong Kong–Zhuhai–Macau Bridge.

Tourism
While tourism is one of the pillars of both economies, Hong Kong and Macau contribute notable proportion of tourists for each other. While Macau is known as the gaming capital of the world and heavily relies on tourism, Hong Kong is the second major source of tourists of Macau. In 2013, 6,766,044 Hongkongers had accounted for near one-fourth of Macau's total visitor arrivals. On the other hand, while Hong Kong is the world's most popular tourist destination, Macau is the sixth visitor source market of Hong Kong, just after Mainland China, Taiwan, the United States, and Japan.

Treaties and agreements
Agreement on The Transfer of Sentenced Persons was signed between Hong Kong and Macau in May 2005. As a result, sentenced persons of the two territories with their respective citizenship would be transferred back to their place of origin.

Despite of the close connection of the two jurisdictions, there are no extradition treaties or agreements signed between Hong Kong and Macau. Charged with committing a crime or convicted of a crime whose punishment has not yet been fully served in either jurisdiction would not be transferred by authorities of one jurisdiction to those of another at the request of the latter for the purpose of prosecution or punishment, respectively.

Incidences

Simplified HK-Macau Immigration Clearance Set was established on 9 December 2009. Citizens are eligible to use their identity cards to travel between the two regions without furnishing arrival and departure cards. However, after the Umbrella Movement, some Hong Kong pro-democrats councillors are barred from entering Macau. Hong Kong Democratic Party legislative councillor Dr Helena Wong Pik-wan on 29 August 2017, Hong Kong NeoDemocrats district councillor Kwan Wing-yip on 30 August 2017, Civic Party district councillor Andy Yu Tak-po on 3 September 2017 were denied entry into Macau. The spokesman of Civic Party urged Hong Kong Chief Executive Carrie Lam Cheng Yuet-ngor to express their concerns with Macau and demand an explanation.

References

Macau
Hong Kong